{{DISPLAYTITLE:C3H4S2}}
The molecular formula C3H4S2 may refer to:

 Dithioles
 1,2-Dithiole, a type of heterocycle with the parent 1,2-dithiacyclopentene
 1,3-Dithiole, a type of heterocycle with the parent 1,3-dithiacyclopentene